Souled Out is a compilation album by the Raeltes with Ike & Tina Turner. The album was released on Ray Charles' Tangerine label in 1970. It is the first album by Charles' girl group, the Raelets who were also his backing vocalists.

Recording and release 
Souled Out features eight songs by the Raelets who were the background singers for Ray Charles, and four songs from R&B duo Ike & Tina Turner.

Ike & Tina Turner recorded for Tangerine Records in 1966, resulting in the singles "Dust My Broom" and "Anything You Wasn't Born With." After the success of "Proud Mary" by Ike & Tina Turner in 1971, "Dust My Broom" was reissued as a single from the album and reached No. 54 on the Cash Box R&B chart.

Critical reception 
The album was selected as a special merit pick from Billboard magazine.

Billboard (February 28, 1970): Ray Charles' Tangerine label features the Raelets and benefits greatly by the addition of Ike a Tina Turner to the album. The Raelets star on "I Get Along All Right," plus Charles' "A Lover's Blues" and "One Hurt Deserves Another," while the Minit Records duo kick up a storm on "Dust My Broom," "Beauty Is Just Skin Deep" and two others. A quality album for the ABC-distributed label, offering both the soft and funky side of soul.

Track listing

References 

Ike & Tina Turner compilation albums
Tangerine Records (1962) albums
1970 compilation albums